Malaysia has many nursing schools, both public and private.

Private nursing schools
 Kuala Lumpur
 International Medical University
 Tung Shin Academy Of Nursing
 Perak
 Lake View College (Formerly known as Bukit Merah Laketown Institute Of Allied Health Sciences)
 Negeri Sembilan
 International Institute of Science Mantin (IASM)
 Murni College
 Penang
 Adventist College of Nursing and Health Sciences
 Lam Wah Ee Nursing College
 Selangor
 Universiti Tunku Abdul Rahman Faculty of Medicine and Health Sciences
 Assunta College of Nursing (Formerly known as Tun Tan Cheng Lock College of Nursing)
 International Medical College (Formerly known as Pantai College of Nursing & Health Science)
 Sime Darby Nursing and Health Sciences College (Formerly known as SJMC Academy of Nursing and Health Sciences)
 International University College of Nursing (IUCN)
Noble Care Malaysia

Public nursing schools
 Johor
 Hospital Muar Nursing College
 Hospital Sultanah Aminah Nursing College
 Kedah
 Hospital Alor Star Nursing College
 Hospital Sungai Petani Nursing College
 Kelantan
 Kubang Kerian Nursing College
 Melaka
 Hospital Melaka Nursing College
 Negeri Sembilan
 Hospital Seremban Nursing College
 Pahang
 Hospital Tengku Ampuan Afzan Nursing College
 International Islamic University Malaysia
 Penang
 Hospital Bukit Mertajam Nursing College
 Hospital Pulau Pinang Nursing College
 Perak
 Hospital Taiping Nursing College
 Ipoh Nursing College
 Sabah
 Hospital Duchess of Kent Nursing College
 Hospital Queen Elizabeth Nursing College
 Sarawak
 Sibu Nursing College
 Terengganu
 Hospital Kuala Terengganu Nursing College

See also
 Healthcare in Malaysia

 
Nursing schools
Malaysia